Sepidareh-ye Darmeh (also Romanized as Sepīdāreh-ye Dārmeh; also known as Darmeh) is a village in Gavork-e Nalin Rural District, Vazineh District, Sardasht County, West Azerbaijan Province, Iran. At the 2006 census, its population was 152, in 28 families.

References 

Populated places in Sardasht County